Richard Allan "Footer" Johnson (born February 15, 1932) is a former Major League Baseball player. He did not have a hit in his five at-bats, but did score a run during one of his pinch running appearances.

In the minor leagues, Johnson was primarily an outfielder. He played in the minors from  until .

Sources

Chicago Cubs players
Des Moines Bruins players
Cedar Rapids Indians players
Burlington Bees players
Memphis Chickasaws players
Pueblo Dodgers players
Fort Worth Cats players
San Antonio Missions players
Lancaster Red Roses players
Duke Blue Devils baseball players
Baseball players from Dayton, Ohio
1932 births
Living people